Ra is one of the fourteen provinces of Fiji.  Occupying the northern area of Viti Levu, the largest island, it is one of eight Viti Levu-based Provinces.  With a land area of 1341 square kilometers, it had a population of 30,432 at the 2017 census.  The main urban centre is at Vaileka, with a population of 3,361 in 1996.

The province has 19 districts:
Bureivanua
Bureiwai
Kavula
Lawaki
Mataso
Nababa
Nailuva
Nakorotubu
Nakuilava
Nalaba
Nalawa
Naroko
Nasau
Navitilevu
Navolau
Rakiraki
Raviravi
Saivou
Tokaimalo

The districts of Saivou, Nakorotubu, Rakiraki, and Nalawa have their own chiefs. The four chiefs are the Gone Turaga na Vunivalu na Tui Nalawa, Gone Marama na Ratu ni Natauiya Turaga na Gonesau and Gone Turaga Tu Navitilevu.

Ra Province has 19 tikina makawa and has 86 villages.

Ra is governed by a Provincial Council, currently chaired by Mr Simione Naikarua who was a former Board Secretary of Airport Fiji Limited and former Chief Executive Officer of the Nasinu Town Council. Mr Simione Naikarua hails from Burenitu village in the district of Nalawa in Ra.

There was an attempt in 2015 to create a "Christian state" in Ra.  This was described by the then Chief of Police, Ben Groenewald, as a harmless cult, but the prime minister Frank Bainimarama took a sterner view and ordered a clamp-down by the army.

It was due to claims by the “cult” that the constitution of Fiji violated the UN Indigenous People's Rights. But in order to ask for the UN's help, it had to be from a nation, hence The Ra Christian State was born to contest the constitution. Many of the conspirators have been put in jail for Sedition and Treason.

The Ra dialect of Fijian is distinctive in that the consonant /t/, pronounced elsewhere in Fiji, is pronounced as a glottal stop.

References

 
Provinces of Fiji
Ra, Fiji